German submarine U-276 was a Type VIIC U-boat of Nazi Germany's Kriegsmarine during World War II.

The submarine was laid down on 24 February 1942 at the Bremer Vulkan yard at Bremen-Vegesack as yard number 41. She was launched on 24 October and commissioned on 9 December under the command of Oberleutnant zur See Jürgen Thimme.

Design
German Type VIIC submarines were preceded by the shorter Type VIIB submarines. U-276 had a displacement of  when at the surface and  while submerged. She had two shafts and two  propellers.

U-276 was fitted with five  torpedo tubes (four fitted at the bow and one at the stern), fourteen torpedoes, one  SK C/35 naval gun, 220 rounds, and two twin  C/30 anti-aircraft guns. The boat had a complement of between forty-four and sixty.

Service history
U-276 served with the 8th U-boat Flotilla for training from December 1942 to February 1944 and operationally with the 1st U-boat Flotilla from 1 March 1944. She was then reassigned to the 31st U-boat Flotilla on 1 July. She carried out three patrols, but sank no ships.

She was 'stricken' in September 1944 at Neustadt and used as a floating electrical generating plant. She was scuttled in May 1945.

She carried out short voyages between Kiel in Germany and Bergen and Trondheim in Norway over February and March 1944.

First patrol
The boat departed Trondheim on 22 March 1944 and returned to the Norwegian port fifteen days later on 6 April.

Second patrol
Her second sortie was relatively uneventful, apart from two crew members being wounded in an accident with the anti-aircraft gun.

Third patrol
By now the boat was based at Stavanger, from where she departed on 8 June 1944. She returned there on the 25th.

The submarine sailed back to Kiel in July 1944.

Fate
The boat was 'stricken' at Neustadt on 29 September 1944 and re-employed as a floating electrical generator. On 3 May 1945, the U-boat was damaged in a rocket attack by four Hawker Typhoons of No. 175 Squadron RAF. As a result of the damage, she was scuttled later that same day.

References

Bibliography

External links

German Type VIIC submarines
U-boats commissioned in 1942
World War II submarines of Germany
1942 ships
Ships built in Bremen (state)
U-boats scuttled in 1945